Benjamin "Ben" Mitchell (born 30 November 1992) is an Australian professional tennis player who as of March 2021 is unranked by the Association of Tennis Professionals (ATP). 

As a junior, Mitchell enjoyed a successful career in which he reached one junior grand slam singles final at the 2010 Wimbledon Championships and reached a ranking of World No. 20. In January 2012, he competed in his first ATP main draw event at the Brisbane International. His last appearance, to date, was at an ITF event in Toowoomba, Australia, in October 2018.

Personal life
Mitchell is the younger brother of former Home and Away actor, Luke Mitchell. Mitchell comes from a tennis-loving family and also has two other brothers and one sister. He has a daughter named Zara. 

In December 2015, Mitchell withdrew from the final round of the 2016 Australian Open Main Draw Wildcard playoff to be present for the birth of his daughter. Mitchell has coached at Brisbane Boys College.

Junior career
Mitchell competed in his first junior ITF under 18 event in December 2005 as a 13-year-old, he was beaten soundly in the first round by James Wong 6–3 6–1. Mitchell had varying success between Australian and New Zealand tournaments through 2006–2008 which included his first final in Darwin. Mitchell stopped playing junior tournaments in 2009 to focus on senior tournaments and in doing so entered his last season as a junior in 2010 without a ranking. Tennis Australia provided wildcards into the Traralgon International and the Australian Open junior event and Mitchell did not disappoint. He reached the final of the Traralgon International and the quarterfinals of the Australian Open juniors event. Following his successful Australian summer Mitchell won his first and only junior title in Nonthaburi, Thailand where he defeated Suk-Young Jeong in the final 7–5 6–3.

In the last event Mitchell ever entered he recorded his best result as he went through qualifying to reach the final of the 2010 Junior Wimbledon Championships where he lost in straight sets to Márton Fucsovics 4–6 4–6.

Junior singles titles (1)

Junior Grand Slam finals

Singles: 1 (1 runner-up)

Professional career

2010 – 2012
In June, Mitchell participated in a futures tournament in Australia, where he lost in straight sets in the first round to Krishananth Balakrishnan of Australia. In November 2010, Mitchell entered the Australian Open Wild Card Play-offs, hoping to win himself a main draw wild card for the 2011 Australian Open. However, Mitchell lost to fellow Australian and fourth seed, Matthew Ebden in the quarterfinals.

At the 2011 Australian Open, Mitchell received a wild card into the Men's Doubles along with James Duckworth, but they were defeated in the first round by Daniel Nestor and Max Mirnyi.

Mitchell won his first futures title in February (Australia F2) against Michael Look.

Mitchell played in the 2012 Australian Open but lost in the first round to John Isner 4–6, 4–6, 6–7.

2013
Mitchell started his year at the 2013 Brisbane International after he was awarded a wildcard. he lost in the first round to Marcos Baghdatis in straight sets. Mitchell received a wildcard into the 2013 Australian Open after winning the Australian Open Wildcard Playoff. He lost to countrymen James Duckworth in the first round in five sets. Mitchell then had two consecutive first round losses. The first at the 2013 McDonald's Burnie International to top seed John Millman and then at the 2013 Charles Sturt Adelaide International to Suk-Young Jeong.

In October, Mitchell won the Melbourne Challenger pairing Thanasi Kokkinakis. This was his first challenger title. However he lost in the opening round of the singles to Bradley Klahn in straight sets. Mitchell then reached the quarterfinals of the Traralgon Challenger where he lost to James Duckworth.

2014
Mitchell began his year at the 2014 Brisbane International in qualifying where he defeated seventh seed Wayne Odesnik in the first round in straight sets. He lost in the second round in a third set tiebreak to Pierre-Hugues Herbert. Mitchell then played in qualifying at the 2014 Australian Open where he lost in the first round against John-Patrick Smith in straight sets. Mitchell partnered with Jordan Thompson in the Men's Doubles where they won their first round over Carlos Berlocq and Alejandro González in three sets. This marked the first match win that Mitchell or Thompson had at a Grand Slam. They lost in the second round against 14th seeds and eventual champions Łukasz Kubot and Robert Lindstedt. Mitchell then competed at the Burnie International where he defeated Luke Saville in the first round. He retired in the quarter finals. 
Mitchell lost in the first round of qualification for Wimbledon to Marius Copil. On 6 July, Mitchell won his first title of the year at the Canada F4, defeating the #1 seed Filip Peliwo 6–3, 2–6, 6–4.

2015: career high
Mitchell lost in the first round of qualifying for the Australian Open to eventual qualifier Illya Marchenko before playing two challengers in Tasmania where he made the semi-final in Burnie and quarter final in Launceston. In late February, Mitchell made the second round of the Shimadzu Challenger where he won the doubles with Jordan Thompson. Mitchell reached a career high of 204 on 2 March 2015. In March, Mitchell played two events in China. He lost to eventual winner Kimmer Coppejans in round 1 of Guangzhou challenger and retired with a back injury in round 1 of the Shenzhen challenger. 
Mitchell didn't play again until the 2015 French Open where he lost in round 1 of qualifying before turning to grass, where he lost in round 1 of the Manchester Challenger to eventual winner Sam Groth. Mitchell then attempted to qualify for Wimbledon but lost in the second round. Mitchell won his first Challenger tournament, the Canberra International, defeating compatriot Luke Saville in the final 5–7 6–0 6–1.

2016: hiatus
Mitchell commenced 2016 with a wild card into the 2016 Brisbane International but lost in round 1 to Tobias Kamke. He made the second round of qualifying for the 2016 Australian Open and the quarter final of the Launceston Challenger before heading to Asia and North America. Mitchell returned to Australia in September and played two Futures tournaments. In November 2016, Mitchell decided to take an indefinite break from tennis until the "fire in the belly" returns.

2017: return
In September Mitchell returned to play after a 10-month hiatus at the Australia F4 in Alice Springs. Mitchell told Tennis Australia "It’s early days, my first tournament back, but obviously I’m refreshed mentally" adding "I feel like I want to be here and I want to do well, so there’s obviously been a big change in mindset". He lost in the second round. The following week, Mitchell made the final of the Australia F5 in Brisbane, losing to Bradley Mousley. He played the rest of the season in Australia, ending the year with a ranking of 734.

ATP Challenger and ITF Futures finals

Singles: 19 (10–9)

Doubles: 5 (3–2)

Grand Slam singles performance timeline

References

External links 
 
 
 

Australian male tennis players
1992 births
Living people
Hopman Cup competitors
Tennis people from the Gold Coast